United Nations Security Council Resolution 199, adopted on December 30, 1964, requested that all States refrain (or in some cases cease) from intervening in the domestic affairs of the Congo and appealed for a cease-fire there.  After applauding the Organization for African Unity the Council called on States to assist it in achieving its objectives in the Democratic Republic of the Congo.

On December 9, 1964, the DR Congo requested a Security Council meeting to discuss interventions in its internal affairs by many countries. Prior to the resolution being passed, a number of African states were invited to discuss the matter. Resolution 199 passed with ten votes, while France abstained from the vote.

See also
List of United Nations Security Council Resolutions 101 to 200 (1953–1965)
 The Congo Crisis

References

External links
 
Text of the Resolution at undocs.org

 0199
 0199
1964 in the Democratic Republic of the Congo
December 1964 events